Châtel-Saint-Germain ((1941-1944) Germannsburg) is a commune in the Moselle department in Grand Est in north-eastern France.

It is situated at the foot of Mount Saint-Germain, which was formerly a strategic location overlooking the Paris-Metz road.  The area has been occupied since the Neolithic period.

See also
 Communes of the Moselle department

References

External links
 

Communes of Moselle (department)